Harald Natvig (10 June 1872 – 1 August 1947) was a Norwegian physician and a sport shooter, who won three gold medals in the 1920 and 1924 Summer Olympics.

Life 
Natvig graduated in 1898 and worked as a municipal doctor in Lyngør, Kristiansund and Flakstad. Since 1905 Natvig ran his own medical practice in Bergen, and from 1908 in Oslo. During the 1912–1913 First Balkan War, he worked as a surgeon in a Serbian field hospital. In the 1918 Finnish Civil War, Natvig led a Norwegian Red Cross ambulance on the White side.  In late 1918, Natvig published a book of his photographs on the Finnish Civil War. Especially those taken in the Battle of Länkipohja have become famous.

Sports career 
He participated in shooting at the 1920 Summer Olympics in Antwerp and won the gold medals both in team 100 meter running deer, single shots and team 100 meter running deer, double shots. He won the individual bronze medal in 100 meter running deer, single shot. At the 1924 Summer Olympics in Paris he won the gold medal in team 100 meter running deer, single shots and the silver medal in team 100 meter running deer, double shots.

Bibliography 
Fra den finske frihedskrig 1918: Vestarméen, Kristiania: Mittet & Co. Kunstforlag, 1918.

References

1872 births
1947 deaths
ISSF rifle shooters
Norwegian male sport shooters
Olympic gold medalists for Norway
Olympic silver medalists for Norway
Olympic bronze medalists for Norway
Olympic shooters of Norway
Shooters at the 1920 Summer Olympics
Shooters at the 1924 Summer Olympics
Olympic medalists in shooting
Medalists at the 1920 Summer Olympics
Medalists at the 1924 Summer Olympics
Sportspeople from Stavanger